The Queensland Railways B13 Baldwin class locomotive was a one locomotive class of 4-6-0 steam locomotive operated by the Queensland Railways.

History
In February 1908 a Baldwin Locomotive Works 4-6-0 locomotive was delivered to the Cairns-Mulgrave Tramway. It was acquired by Queensland Railways in December 1911 with the tramway and numbered 5. Per Queensland Railway's classification system it was designated the B13 class, B representing it had three driving axles, and the 13 the cylinder diameter in inches.

See also
Queensland B13 class locomotive

References

Baldwin locomotives
Railway locomotives introduced in 1908
B13
3 ft 6 in gauge locomotives of Australia
4-6-0 locomotives